Monique Teillaud is a French researcher in computational geometry at the French Institute for Research in Computer Science and Automation (INRIA) in Nancy, France. She moved to Nancy in 2014 from a different INRIA center in Sophia Antipolis, where she was one of the developers of CGAL, a software library of computational geometry algorithms.

Teillaud graduated from the École Normale Supérieure de Jeunes Filles in 1985, she then got a position at École nationale supérieure d'informatique pour l'industrie et l'entreprise before moving to Inria in 1989. She completed her Ph.D. in 1991 at Paris-Sud University under the supervision of Jean-Daniel Boissonnat. 
She was the 2008 program chair of the Symposium on Computational Geometry.
She is also the author or editor of two books in computational geometry:
Towards Dynamic Randomized Algorithms in Computational Geometry (Lecture Notes in Computer Science 758, Springer, 1993)
Effective Computational Geometry for Curves and Surfaces (edited with Boissonat, Springer, 2007)

References

External links

Living people
French computer scientists
French mathematicians
French women computer scientists
Women mathematicians
Researchers in geometric algorithms
1961 births